Duah may refer to:

Dua
Duah (surname)